KOMT (93.5 FM) is a radio station airing a talk format licensed to Lakeview, Arkansas. The station serves the Mountain Home, Arkansas area, and is owned by John M. Dowdy.

Previous logo

References

External links
KOMT's website

Talk radio stations in the United States
OMT
Baxter County, Arkansas